Burg Vichtenstein is a castle in Upper Austria, Austria.

The Vichtenstein castle sits in the "sow forest" (upper Austria) above the Danube valley opposite to the market municipality of Upper Cell (Lower Bavaria). The castle is in the centre of the municipality Vichtenstein. There is no documentary for the construction of the castle but it is believed to have been started around the year 1100. The castle was an administrative centre of the Bishopric of Passau and in the 14th century it was mortgaged several times until it became the property of the counts of Schauberg.

See also
List of castles in Austria

References

This article was initially translated from the German Wikipedia.

Castles in Upper Austria
History of Upper Austria
Sauwald